Fireweed: A Feminist Quarterly of Writing, Politics, Art & Culture, was founded in Toronto, Canada, in 1978 by the Fireweed Collective. Collective members have included Gay Allison, Lynne Fernie, Hilda Kirkwood, Liz Brady, Elizabeth Ruth, Makeda Silvera, Carolyn Smart and Rhea Tregebov. Issues of Fireweed usually focuses on a theme or topic, such as "Writing" (#10), "Fear & Violence" (#14), "Women of Colour" (#16), "Sex & Sexuality" (#37 & 38), and "Language" (#44/45), though there are frequent "open" issues.

The quarterly's ISSN is 0706-3857.

See also
List of literary magazines

References

External links
Contact info according to McClelland & Stewart
 Review of the Canadian women poets issue by Nanci White "Fireweed: A Feminist Quarterly, 23 (Summer 1986)" in Canadian Woman Studies/les cahiers de la femme,  8 (3), 1987.
Fireweed archives are held at the University of Ottawa Archives and Special Collections.

1978 establishments in Ontario
Literary magazines published in Canada
Political magazines published in Canada
Women's magazines published in Canada
Feminism in Canada
Feminist magazines
Magazines established in 1978
Magazines published in Toronto
Quarterly magazines published in Canada